Duets (1993) is an album by American saxophonist and composer Anthony Braxton with bassist Mario Pavone recorded in 1993 for the Music & Arts label.

Track listing
All compositions by Anthony Braxton except where noted
 "The Call" Maario Pavone) – 5:58	
 "Composition No. 29" – 5:41
 "Composition No. 6 (0)" – 5:28
 "I Remember You" (Victor Schertzinger, Johnny Mercer) – 6:36
 "Composition No. 87" – 11:48	
 "Double" (Pavone) – 5:26	
 "Composition No. 65" – 5:42	
 "Composition No. 135" – 10:18	
 "Stalemates" (Benny Golson) – 7:09

Personnel
Anthony Braxton – saxophone, flute  
Mario Pavone – bass

References

1993 albums
Anthony Braxton albums
Mario Pavone albums
Music & Arts albums